Mac Raghnaill is a masculine surname in the Irish language. The name translates into English as "son of Raghnall". The surname originated as a patronym, however it no longer refers to the actual name of the bearer's father.

The name Raghnall is a Gaelic derivative of the Old Norse personal name Røgnvaldr / Rǫgnvaldr / Rögnvaldr. Variant forms of the surname include Mac Rághnaill and Mac Raonaill. These three surnames can be Anglicised variously as: Grannell, MacRanald, MacRandell, MacCrindle, MacReynold, MacReynolds, Randalson, Rondalson, Reynoldson, Rannals, Randals, Randles, Ranolds, and Reynolds. The Irish surnames are borne by numerous unrelated families; some are of Irish origin, others of Scottish origin, some are of English origin, and some may be of Norwegian and or Danish origin.

People with the name

mac Raghnaill
Domhnall mac Raghnaill (fl. 13th century), Hebridean magnate
Ruaidhrí mac Raghnaill (died 1247?), Hebridean magnate

Mac Raghnaill
Ailbhe Mac Raghnaill, better known in English as Albert Reynolds, (born 1932), Irish, Taoiseach of Ireland.
Cathal Mhég Raghnaill., in English Charles Reynolds (born 1496-7), Irish, Archdeacon of Kells.

References

Irish-language masculine surnames
Patronymic surnames
Surnames
Irish families
Surnames of Irish origin